The 2014 Copa Colsanitas was a women's tennis tournament played on outdoor clay courts. It was the 17th edition of the Copa Colsanitas, and part of the International category of the 2014 WTA Tour. It took place at the Centro de Alto Rendimiento in Bogotá, Colombia, from April 7 through April 13, 2014.

Points and prize money

Point distribution

Prize money

Singles main-draw entrants

Seeds 

 Rankings are as of March 31, 2014.

Other entrants 
The following players received wildcards into the singles main draw:
  María Herazo González
  María Irigoyen
  Yuliana Lizarazo

The following players received entry from the qualifying draw:
  Lara Arruabarrena
  Nicole Gibbs
  Florencia Molinero
  Sachia Vickery

The following players received entry as lucky losers:
  Irina Khromacheva
  Sofia Shapatava

Withdrawals 
Before the tournament
  Estrella Cabeza Candela --> replaced by Tadeja Majerič
  Sharon Fichman (gastrointestinal illness) --> replaced by Irina Khromacheva
  Anna-Lena Friedsam --> replaced by Irina-Camelia Begu
  Olga Govortsova (left knee injury) --> replaced by Sofia Shapatava
  Anabel Medina Garrigues --> replaced by Mathilde Johansson
  Mandy Minella --> replaced by Alla Kudryavtseva
  Laura Robson --> replaced by Mariana Duque
  Yaroslava Shvedova --> replaced by Tatjana Maria
  Ajla Tomljanović --> replaced by Olivia Rogowska

Doubles main-draw entrants

Seeds 

 Rankings are as of March 31, 2014.

Other entrants 
The following pairs received wildcards into the doubles main draw:
  María Herazo González /  María Paulina Pérez
  Paula Ormaechea /  Sloane Stephens
The following pairs received entry as alternates:
  Anastasia Grymalska /  Christina Shakovets
  Chieh-Yu Hsu /  Elitsa Kostova

Withdrawals 
Before the tournament
  Teliana Pereira (thigh injury)
  Olivia Rogowska (right thigh injury)
During the tournament
  Elitsa Kostova (right wrist injury)

Champions

Singles 

   Caroline Garcia def.  Jelena Janković, 6–3, 6–4

Doubles 

  Lara Arruabarrena /  Caroline Garcia def.  Vania King /  Chanelle Scheepers, 7–6(7–5), 6–4

References

External links 
 Source: WTA Draw
Official website

Copa Claro Colsanitas
Copa Colsanitas
Copa Claro Colsanitas